Solorina spongiosa, commonly known as the fringed chocolate chip lichen, is a species of lichen in the family Peltigeraceae. It was first formally described as a new species by the Swedish lichenologist Erik Acharius as Collema spongiosum. Italian botanist Martino Anzi transferred it to the genus Solorina in 1862.

The tissue containing the photobiont green algae is limited to a ragged ring surrounding the apothecia. Solorina spongiosa is typically found in regions with arctic to alpine tundra habitats, although in rare instances it has been recorded growing on the ground in shaded boreal habitats.

References

Peltigerales
Lichens described in 1810
Lichens of Europe
Lichens of North America
Taxa named by Erik Acharius
Lichens of the Arctic
Lichen species